Media queries is a feature of CSS 3 allowing content rendering to adapt to different conditions such as screen resolution (e.g. mobile and desktop screen size). It became a W3C recommended standard in June 2012, and is a cornerstone technology of responsive web design (RWD).

History
Media queries were first sketched in Håkon Wium Lie's initial CSS proposal in 1994, but they did not become part of CSS 1. The HTML4 Recommendation from 1997 shows an example of how media queries could be added in the future. In 2000, W3C started work on media queries and also on another scheme for supporting various devices: CC/PP. The two address the same problem, but CC/PP is server-centric, while media queries are browser-centric. The first public working draft for media queries was published in 2001, and the specification became a W3C Recommendation in 2012 after browsers added support.

Usage
A media query consists of a media type and one or more expressions, involving media features, which resolve to either true or false. The result of the query is true if the media type specified in the media query matches the type of device the document is being displayed on and all expressions in the media query are true. When a media query is true, the corresponding style sheet or style rules are applied, following the normal cascading rules.
Media queries use the @media CSS "at-rule".

Examples
The following are examples of CSS media queries:

@media screen and (display-mode: fullscreen) {
  /* Code in here only applies to screens in fullscreen */
}
@media all and (orientation: landscape) {
  /* Code in here only applies in landscape orientation */
}
@media screen and (min-device-width: 500px) {
  /* Code in here only applies to screens equal or greater than 500 pixels wide */
}

Media types
A media type can be declared in the head of an HTML document using the "media" attribute inside of a <link> element. The value of the "media" attribute specifies on what device the linked document will be displayed. Media types can also be declared within XML processing instructions, the @import at-rule, and the @media at-rule. CSS 2 defines the following as media types:
 all (suitable for all devices)
 braille
 embossed
 handheld
 print
 projection
 screen
 speech
 tty
 TV

The media type "all" can also be used to indicate that a style sheet applies to all media types.

Media features
The following table contains the media features listed in the latest W3C recommendation for media queries, dated 6 June 2007.

References

External links
 W3C – Media Queries recommendation 19 June 2012
 W3C – CSS specs > Media Queries
 CodeSpot – CSS Media Queries

Cascading Style Sheets
Responsive web design
Adaptive web design